LaRue County is a county in the central region of the U.S. state of Kentucky, outside the Bluegrass Region and larger population centers. As of the 2020 census, the population was 14,867.  Its county seat is Hodgenville, which is best known as the birthplace of United States President Abraham Lincoln. The county was establshed on March 4, 1843, from the southeast portion of Hardin County. It was named for John P. LaRue, an early settler. LaRue County is included in the Elizabethtown-Fort Knox, KY Metropolitan Statistical Area, which is also included in the Louisville/Jefferson County-Elizabethtown-Bardstown, KY-IN Combined Statistical Area. It is a dry county.

Geography
The low rolling hills of LaRue County have been largely cleared and devoted to agriculture or urban development, with only the drainages of the eastern portions still wooded. The highest point ( ASL) is a small hill near its border with Taylor County.

Adjacent counties

 Nelson County − northeast
 Marion County − east
 Taylor County − southeast
 Green County − south/CST Border
 Hart County − southwest/CST Border
 Hardin County − northwest

National protected area
 Abraham Lincoln Birthplace National Historic Site

Demographics

2000 census
As of the census of 2000, there were 13,373 people, 5,275 households, and 3,866 families in the county. There were 5,860 housing units at an average density of 22 per square mile (9/km2). The racial makeup of the county was 94.65% White, 3.54% Black or African American, 0.19% Native American, 0.16% Asian, 0.03% Pacific Islander, 0.34% from other races, and 1.10% from two or more races. 1.05% of the population were Hispanic or Latino of any race.

There were 5,275 households, out of which 32.50% had children under the age of 18 living with them, 59.20% were married couples living together, 10.50% had a female householder with no husband present, and 26.70% were non-families. 23.70% of all households were made up of individuals, and 11.20% had someone living alone who was 65 years of age or older. The average household size was 2.49 and the average family size was 2.94.

The county population contained 25.00% under the age of 18, 7.70% from 18 to 24, 28.20% from 25 to 44, 24.00% from 45 to 64, and 15.00% who were 65 years of age or older. The median age was 38 years. For every 100 females, there were 95.40 males. For every 100 females age 18 and over, there were 92.90 males.

The median income for a household in the county was $32,056, and the median income for a family was $37,786. Males had a median income of $30,907 versus $20,091 for females. The per capita income for the county was $15,865. 15.40% of the population and 12.60% of families were below the poverty line. Out of the total people living in poverty, 18.90% are under the age of 18 and 16.40% are 65 or older.

Communities

Cities
 Hodgenville (county seat)
 Upton (mostly in Hardin County)

Census-designated places
 Buffalo
 Magnolia

Unincorporated communities

 Athertonville
 Ginseng
 Gleanings
 Lyons
 Malt
 Mount Sherman
 Tanner
 Tonieville
 White City

Churches

 Hodgenville Pentecostal Church (HPC)
 Hodgenville United Methodist Church
 Our Lady of Mercy Catholic Church
 LaRue Baptist Church, an Independent Baptist church
 Victory Baptist Church
 First Baptist Church of Hodgenville (relocated from Downtown Hodgenville to near Lincoln Parkway on the edge of the city limits.)
 First Baptist Church on Lincoln Blvd, Hodgenville
 Buffalo Baptist Church, Buffalo
 Mt. Tabor Baptist Church
 Union Christian Church
 Magnolia Baptist Church
 Roanoke House of Prayer
 Lane Lincoln Baptist Church
 Athertonville Baptist Church
 Oakhill Baptist Church
 South Fork Baptist Church
 Wesley Meadows United Methodist Church
 Levelwoods United Methodist Church
 Parkway Baptist Church
 Steadfast Baptist Church

Lincoln Days
The county sponsors the annual Lincoln Days celebration on the first full weekend of October, Friday through Sunday. Highlights include the Lincoln Look-A-Like contests, rail-splitting competitions, a parade, shopping booths and concerts by local talent (mostly country, bluegrass and Southern gospel).

Politics
LaRue County has leaned heavily Republican in presidential elections since the turn of the century. Three-quarters of the county's overall vote went to Donald Trump in the 2016 election.

See also

 Dry county
 Louisville/Jefferson County–Elizabethtown–Bardstown, KY-IN Combined Statistical Area
 National Register of Historic Places listings in LaRue County, Kentucky

References

 
1843 establishments in Kentucky
Populated places established in 1843
Kentucky counties
Elizabethtown metropolitan area
LaRue family